Joseph Talbot was Dean of Cashel from 1924 to 1946.

He was educated  Trinity College, Dublin and ordained in 1899. His first post was as a Curate at Cahir after which he was  a Chaplain to the Forces at Portsmouth. After further curacies at Waterford and Lismore he was the incumbent at Clonbeg then Shanrahan. His son Maurice John Talbot became Dean of Limerick.

References

Irish Anglicans
Alumni of Trinity College Dublin
Deans of Cashel